Hof is an Ortsgemeinde – a community belonging to a Verbandsgemeinde – in the Westerwaldkreis in Rhineland-Palatinate, Germany.

Geography

The community lies in the Westerwald between Limburg and Siegen on the boundary with North Rhine-Westphalia. The Schwarze Nister, which belongs to the Sieg drainage basin, flows through the municipal area. Hof belongs to the Verbandsgemeinde of Bad Marienberg, a kind of collective municipality. Its seat is in the like-named town.

Hof lies in a hollow at the foot of the Westerwald's third highest elevation (Salzburger Kopf, 653 m) with a mean elevation of 550 m on the old Cologne-Leipzig trade road.

History
The community that exists today, which had its first documentary mention in 1048, has grown over the last 50 years from a former agriculturally based place to a flourishing commercial centre.

From the 14th to the 19th century there was already an important chapel in Hof.

In 1589, there were 18 families in Hof, who had fallen in number by 1648 – after the Thirty Years' War – to only 3 families.

When Johann Baptista von Langenbach, called Sassenroth, donated a parcel of land to the village in the 16th century, the community's first school was built there.

By 1607, the number of families had risen once again to 15, and the 27 horses counted there in 1610 might point to a great number of coachmen in the village.

In 1825, the population figure was 537. Marienberg counted, on the other hand, only 388 inhabitants that same year.

At the turn of the 20th century, Hof counted 702 inhabitants, and in 1960, the one thousandth inhabitant was welcomed.

Today, Hof is a village with more than 1,400 people and more than 600 jobs.

Politics

The municipal council is made up of 16 council members who were elected in a majority vote in a municipal election on 13 June 2004.

Economy and infrastructure

Transport
Right through the community runs Bundesstraße 414, leading from Hohenroth to Hachenburg. The nearest Autobahn interchange is Haiger-Burbach on the A 45 (Dortmund–Gießen), some 17 km away. The nearest InterCityExpress stop is the railway station at Montabaur on the Cologne-Frankfurt high-speed rail line.

References

External links
  Hof in the collective municipality’s Web pages 
 Hof 

Municipalities in Rhineland-Palatinate
Westerwaldkreis